Katrin A. Flikschuh FBA is professor of political theory at the London School of Economics (LSE). Flikschuh's research interests relate to the political philosophy of Immanuel Kant, metaphysics and meta-level justification in contemporary political philosophy, global justice and cosmopolitanism, and the history of modern political thought.

Education

Flikschuh earned her BA at the University of Essex and her MSc from the School of Oriental and African Studies. She received her PhD from the University of Essex.

Professional career

Flikschuh was a lecturer in philosophy at the University of Essex and has held lectureships in philosophy at the University of Bristol and in politics at the University of Manchester. She joined the LSE Government Department in 2003.

In 2014, Flikschuh was elected a fellow of the British Academy, the United Kingdom's national academy for the humanities and social sciences.

Flikschuh has travelled throughout West Africa. She was appointed Principal Investigator of a Leverhulme Trust International Networks Project, which explores connections between African and Western social and political thought.

Flikschuh speaks French and German.

Books
She published her book "Kant and Modern Political Philosophy" in 2000 (paperback edition was published in 2008).
In this book she speaks about the relevance of Kant's political thought to major issues and problems in contemporary political philosophy.

Selected publications
Kant and Modern Political Philosophy. Cambridge University Press, Cambridge, 2000.  
Freedom: Contemporary Liberal Perspectives. Key Concepts. Polity, Cambridge, 2007. 
What is Orientation in Global Thinking? A Kantian Inquiry. Cambridge University Press, Cambridge, 2017. 
"Reason, right, and revolution: Kant and Locke." Philosophy and Public Affairs, 36 (4), 2008, pp. 375–404. 
"On the cogency of human rights", Jurisprudence, 2 (1), 2011. pp. 17–36.

References

External links 
 Discussion on Philosophy in Africa (audio)

Academics of the London School of Economics
Living people
Year of birth missing (living people)
British political scientists
Alumni of the University of Essex
Alumni of SOAS University of London
Academics of the University of Essex
Academics of the University of Bristol
Fellows of the British Academy
Women political scientists